Comwave Networks Inc. is a Canadian company that markets telecommunication services. Actual telecommunication services are provided by third party carriers. Based in the Toronto district of North York and run by president and CEO, Yuval Barzakay, Comwave was established in 1999 and it serves all of Canada. Wholesale services are also provided in the United States.

Services

Telephone
Comwave offers phone, Internet & TV services to both business and residential customers.

Predating Apple's iPhone, beginning in 2004, Comwave offered a bundle of hardware and services, sold as an alternative to traditional phone service known as the iPhone. They no longer offer this service under the iPhone name.

In May 2012, Comwave launched its Hosted PBX platform. Comwave Hosted PBX is a cloud-based phone system for business that bundles together Polycom telephones, phone lines, over 40 business-class features, long-distance and a private digital secure connection, for a fixed monthly fee. Comwave Hosted PBX phone systems are managed by Comwave 24x7 on a secure private connection.

In September 2012, the company launched the ePhone app for Android (now available on iOS as well). This VoIP Softphone app helps users avoid roaming and long-distance fees by providing a free alternate telephone number in the North American market of their choice.

Internet
In April 2013, Comwave launched high-speed internet services across Canada. Their plans are all-inclusive and includes a modem, dry loop, and in-home installation.

Comwave offers a variety of different internet packages ranging from 30 Mbps - 1000 Mbps.

Television
On September 25, 2017, Comwave Networks announced that the company will enter the television market by announcing their new service named Comwave TV.

Legal issues

Misleading advertising
On September 13, 2016, Comwave Networks was fined $300,000 by the Competition Bureau for misleading advertisements.

The Bureau concluded that Comwave's advertisements misrepresented the charges consumers would face for their services, and that the advertised prices were not attainable because of additional non‑optional fees.

The Competition Bureau had determined  that despite Comwave marketing their Voice over IP (VoIP) home phone services and high speed internet services as unlimited, Comwave had applied a monthly minute cap onto their VoIP home phone service, as well as a monthly Bandwidth cap onto all tiers of their internet service regardless; per Comwave's Fair Usage Policy for Internet.

The Bureau has also concluded that while this information was being disclosed in their fine print, and that Comwave's staff had been instructed to provide some of this information to customers when they call into their call centre, it was not sufficient enough to prevent the advertisements from being misleading.

Under a consent agreement filed between The Commissioner of Competition and Comwave Networks, Comwave had agreed to pay $60,000 towards the cost of the Bureau's investigation.

Comwave Networks had also agreed to establish a corporate compliance program to help the company avoid any similar issues in the future, as well as to change their advertisements to accurately explain their services to customers; in order to relieve the Bureau's concerns.

Telemarketing
In April 2013, Comwave was fined $100,000 by the Canadian Radio-television and Telecommunications Commission. The fine was a result of 33 calls made between April 1, 2011, and March 18, 2013, by independent telemarketers, hired by Comwave, to people who had registered their phone numbers on the National Do Not Call List. In response to the fine the company voluntarily agreed to stop telemarketing and report any customer complaints it receives to the CRTC annually.

References

Canadian companies established in 1999
Privately held companies of Canada
IPTV companies of Canada
Companies based in North York
1999 establishments in Ontario